The 1992 Mid-Eastern Athletic Conference men's basketball tournament took place March 4–7, 1992, at Norfolk Scope in Norfolk, Virginia. Top seed Howard defeated three seed , 67–65 in the championship game, to win its third MEAC Tournament title.

The Bison participated in the 1992 NCAA tournament as No. 16 seed in the Midwest Region.

Format
All nine conference members participated, with play beginning in the first round. The top seven teams received byes to the quarterfinal round. Teams were seeded based on their regular season conference record.

Bracket

* denotes overtime period

References

MEAC men's basketball tournament
1991–92 Mid-Eastern Athletic Conference men's basketball season
MEAC men's basketball tournament
Basketball competitions in Norfolk, Virginia
College basketball tournaments in Virginia